Future Force is a 1989 science-fiction film written and directed by David A. Prior and starring David Carradine.  A 1990 sequel to the film was made called Future Zone.

Synopsis
At some point in the near future (around 1993), law enforcement has become so ineffective that the only real hope for justice is an organization of bounty hunters known as C.O.P.S (Civilian Operated Police Systems) John Tucker (David Carradine), a Los Angeles bounty hunter sporting a metal arm piece capable of shooting lasers, is hired to protect a woman reporter (Anna Rapagna) from a gang of renegade cops. While Tucker is more interested in right defeating wrong than in payment for his services, he has become a bitter, washed up, drunken man due to all the corruption he has seen. The reporter has uncovered proof of the corruption and ineffectiveness of the police. Unfortunately, the bounty organization is run by a man who is also corrupt, and the C.O.P.S turn against the duo as well. Tucker does have an ally, Billy, who is a computer genius who utilizes a wheelchair.

Cast
 David Carradine as Tucker
 Robert Tessier as Becker
 Anna Rapagna as Marion
 William Zipp as Adams
 Patrick Culliton as Grimes
 Dawn Wildsmith as Roxanne
 D.C. Douglas as Billy
 Kimberley Casey as Alicia

Release
Future Force was released direct-to-video in the United States by A.I.P. in November 1989.

Reception
From contemporary reviews, "Lor." of Variety reviewed the AIP video cassette on November 12, 1989. "Lor." noted that the film "offers some offbeat social commentary in its sci-fi approach to the future of law enforcement" and that the film "is low-tech but scores high in imagination."

Creature Feature gave the movie 2.5 out of five stars, praising the performance of Carradine, but found little else likeable in the film. The film has a score of 14% at Rotten Tomatoes.

References

External links

American science fiction action films
1980s science fiction action films
1989 films
Films scored by Mark Mancina
American exploitation films
Films directed by David A. Prior
1980s American films
American dystopian films
American action thriller films
American science fiction thriller films